Tectonic Plates is a 1992 independent Canadian film directed by Peter Mettler. Mettler also wrote the screenplay based on the play by Robert Lepage. The film stars Marie Gignac, Céline Bonnier and Robert Lepage. The title of this film was created in terms of a metaphor, as it signifies the evolution of human life and the geology of human behavior.

Plot summary
Madeleine (played by Marie Gignac) is studying art in Montreal, Canada. When her beloved professor (played by Robert Lepage) disappears, Madeleine decides to kill herself in the romantic setting of Venice. However, drug addict Constance (played by Céline Bonnier) dissuades her. Meanwhile, the professor has moved to New York, where he becomes a successful transvestite talk show host under the name of Jennifer.

Cast
Celine Bonnier as Constance. Born in Quebec City, became a young French actress after many successful plays during her theater years. Now working alongside Roy Dupuis, she is known for other French films such as, Unite 9, L'heure Bleue, and La passion d'Augustine.
Boyd Clack as Rhys
Robert Lepage as Jacques/Jennifer
Micheal Benson as Waiter
Normand Bissonnette as Kevin/Chopin
Richard Frechette as Antoine
Marie Gignac as Madeleine

Awards
 Nominated for 2 Genie Awards, for best actor Celine Bonnier and best achievement in art direction Curtis Wehrfritz. Toronto, December 1993.
 Mannheim-Heidelberg International Filmfestival- won the Catholic Film Jury Prize for, "the best film of the festival." Germany, November 1993
 Columbus International Film and Video Festival. The Chris (Statuette) Award of Excellence and the Christopher Columbus Award (Grand Prize). Columbus, Ohio, USA, October 1993.
 Festival International De Cinema De Figuera Da Foz. Won the award for, "The Most Innovative Film of the Festival." Portugal, September 1993.

References

External links

Review by James Berardinelli
Peter Mettler home page

Canadian drama films
Canadian independent films
Films directed by Peter Mettler
1992 films
1992 drama films
Films based on Canadian plays
English-language Canadian films
French-language Canadian films
1990s Canadian films